Nils Johansson (16 April 1920 – 29 June 1999) was a Swedish cyclist. He competed in the individual and team road race events at the 1948 Summer Olympics.

References

External links
 

1920 births
1999 deaths
Swedish male cyclists
Olympic cyclists of Sweden
Cyclists at the 1948 Summer Olympics
People from Borås
Sportspeople from Västra Götaland County